The 1937 Macdonald Brier, the Canadian men's national curling championship, was held from March 1 to 5, 1937 at the Granite Club in Toronto, Ontario.

Both Alberta and Manitoba finished round robin play 8-1, necessitating a tiebreaker playoff for the Brier championship. Team Alberta, who was skipped by Cliff Manahan would win the tiebreaker in dominant fashion over Manitoba 19-7 to capture the Brier Tankard.

Teams
The teams are listed as follows:

Round Robin standings

Round Robin results

Draw 1

Draw 2

Draw 3

Draw 4

Draw 5

Draw 6

Draw 7

Draw 8

Draw 9

Tiebreaker

References 

Macdonald Brier, 1937
Macdonald Brier, 1937
The Brier
Curling in Toronto
Macdonald Brier
Macdonald Brier
1930s in Toronto